Renata Ribeiro (born December 7, 1981) is a Brazilian female beach volleyball player.

Ribeiro and teammate Talita Antunes represented Brazil at the 2008 Summer Olympics in Beijing, China.

References

External links 
 
 

1981 births
Living people
Brazilian women's beach volleyball players
Beach volleyball players at the 2008 Summer Olympics
Olympic beach volleyball players of Brazil
Volleyball players from Rio de Janeiro (city)
21st-century Brazilian women